Apsheronsky (masculine), Apsheronskaya (feminine), or Apsheronskoye (neuter) may refer to:
Apsheronsky District, a district of Krasnodar Krai, Russia
Apsheronsky District, Russian name of Absheron District, a district of Azerbaijan
Apsheronskoye Urban Settlement, a municipal formation which the Town of Apsheronsk in Apsheronsky District of Krasnodar Krai, Russia is incorporated as
Absheron peninsula (Apsheronsky poluostrov), a peninsula in Azerbaijan
Apsheronskaya, name of Apsheronsk, a town in Krasnodar Krai, Russia, until 1947
Apsheronsk narrow-gauge railway (Apsheronskaya railway), a narrow-gauge railway in Krasnodar Krai, Russia